Het Woeden der Gehele Wereld is a 1993 Dutch novel by Maarten 't Hart. The title translates as "The fury/rage/raging of the whole world" and is derived from the text of the poem Au bord de l'eau by Sully Prudhomme, set to music by Gabriel Fauré. It is about the coming of age of Alex Goudveyl, who is bullied by other children and protected by Vroombout, and about a murder that took place some ten years after the time of the German occupation of the Netherlands in World War II. 

It is the basis of a Dutch 2006 film, Het Woeden der Gehele Wereld, directed by Guido Pieters, and produced by Rob Houwer.

Comments by the author
Maarten 't Hart has commented that the film is quite different from the book. He is fine with the film, but, apart from the fact that it was based on his book, he was not and did not want to be involved in it. He especially likes how Inspector Douvetrap and his son with Down syndrome are depicted, just as described in the book.

1993 novels
Novels by Maarten 't Hart
Novels set during World War II
Novels set in the Netherlands
Dutch novels adapted into films